Thomas Georg John Tugendhat,  (born 27 June 1973) is a British politician. A member of the Conservative Party, he has served as Minister of State for Security since September 2022. He previously served as Chairman of the Foreign Affairs Committee from 2017 to 2022. Tugendhat has been the Member of Parliament (MP) for Tonbridge and Malling since 2015.

Before entering politics, he worked as a journalist and as a public relations consultant in the Middle East. He also had a part-time role as an officer in the British Army reserves, the Territorial Army; he served in the Iraq War and the Afghanistan War.

In July 2022, Tugendhat stood in the Conservative Party leadership election, following Prime Minister Boris Johnson's resignation, and was eliminated in the third round of parliamentary voting. He subsequently supported Liz Truss’s bid to become Conservative leader. Following Truss's appointment as Prime Minister, she appointed Tugendhat as Minister of State for Security, a role in which he was continues to serve under the subsequent Prime Minister Rishi Sunak.

Early life and education
Tugendhat was born in Westminster, London, the son of Sir Michael Tugendhat, a High Court judge and his French-born wife Blandine de Loisne. He is a nephew of Lord Tugendhat, a businessman, former Vice President of the European Commission and Conservative Party politician. He was educated at St Paul's School, London, an all-boys private school. He studied theology at the University of Bristol, before doing a Master's degree course in Islamic studies at Gonville and Caius College, Cambridge, and learning Arabic in Yemen. Following university, he briefly served as a journalist at the Lebanese newspaper, The Daily Star.

Military career

On 6 July 2003, Tugendhat was commissioned into the Educational and Training Services Branch of the Adjutant General's Corps, Territorial Army, British Army, as a second lieutenant (on probation). His Territorial Army commission was confirmed on 16 July 2003. He transferred to the Intelligence Corps on 29 July 2003.

Tugendhat was promoted to lieutenant on 16 July 2005, captain on 1 April 2007, and to major on 1 January 2010. He was a Territorial Army lieutenant colonel by July 2013.

Tugendhat served during the Iraq War and the War in Afghanistan. He also served in Afghanistan, in a civilian capacity, for the Foreign & Commonwealth Office (FCO), and helped set up the National Security Council of Afghanistan and the government in Helmand Province. He later served as one of the military assistants to the Chief of the Defence Staff.

Early Parliamentary career
Tugendhat was elected as the Member of Parliament for Tonbridge and Malling, a safe Conservative seat in Kent, at the 2015 general election. He was selected in an open primary in 2013.

In October 2015, Tugendhat accused Iran of arming insurgents in Iraq and Afghanistan: "Through the Quds Force, the special forces unit of the regime's Islamic Revolutionary Guard Corps, it has killed British troops and plotted to assassinate diplomats in Washington DC. The ayatollahs have nurtured terrorists around the world."

Tugendhat voted against Brexit, supporting continued membership of the European Union in the 2016 referendum. He voted in favour of the withdrawal agreement negotiated by Theresa May's government on each of the three occasions it was put to a vote.

On 12 July 2017, Tugendhat was elected chair of the Foreign Affairs Committee, becoming the youngest person ever to hold the post. Soon after the poisoning of Sergei and Yulia Skripal in Salisbury by a nerve agent, Tugendhat said the attack was "if not an act of war … certainly a warlike act by the Russian Federation".

In February 2018, Tugendhat praised Saudi Arabia's Crown Prince Mohammed bin Salman: "He is rightly showing a vision for Saudi Arabia that sees her taking her place as a player in the global economy and I think that is incredibly positive, not just for Saudi Arabia, but for the world."

Under Tugendhat's chairmanship the Foreign Affairs Committee has focused on British foreign policy priorities after Brexit. Other significant enquiries have covered: the implications of China's growing role in the international system, the UK's relationship with India, and the Responsibility to Protect.

On 21 May 2018, the Foreign Affairs Committee published a report on Russian corruption and the UK. This drew attention to the ability of President Vladimir Putin and his allies to launder assets through London, and called on the UK Government to "show stronger political leadership in ending the flow of dirty money into the UK". The report criticised the law firm Linklaters for its unwillingness to give evidence to the committee about the nature of working in the Russian Federation at that time.

Tugendhat has "never made a secret of his ambitions to be Prime Minister one day." In January 2022, he stated he would consider running for the office of Prime Minister if Boris Johnson stood down. The following month, he suggested expelling all Russian citizens from the UK in response to Russia's invasion of Ukraine subsequently clarifying that he meant "all Russian citizens connected to the Putin regime. It's not a blanket expulsion". In July 2022, Tugendhat ran in the Conservative Party leadership election, following Prime Minister Boris Johnson's resignation, and was eliminated in the third round of parliamentary voting with 31 votes. His campaign raised £120,000.

Minister of State for Security 
On 6 September 2022, he was appointed Minister of State for Security in the Home Office as part of Liz Truss's cabinet. He was retained in this role by the Sunak government.

Political positions

Conservatism 
On 7 November 2018, Tugendhat gave a speech on "community conservatism" at an event organised by the Social Market Foundation. In it he described how his military experience had drawn him into politics and outlined several ways in which the government could encourage businesses to better serve the communities in which they operate.

In a recorded conversation with American politician Mike Gallagher, Tugendhat gave an off-the-cuff outline of his foreign policy outlook as "trying to defend the world in which the values that matter to the people of the United Kingdom, and more particularly, the people of Kent, prosper. And those values are freedom, democracy, the ability to challenge authority and the ability to trade and travel globally."

Defence and foreign policy 
On 29 May 2018, Tugendhat set out his own views on British foreign policy in a speech at the Royal United Services Institute. He advocated giving the FCO greater powers to determine overall foreign policy strategy.

China 
In April 2020, Tugendhat founded the China Research Group alongside fellow Conservative MP Neil O'Brien. The group was formed to gain a "better understanding of China's economic ambitions and global role". This is to include Huawei's role in the UK's 5G network (see: Concerns over Chinese involvement in 5G wireless networks), China's COVID-19 disinformation campaign, and its foreign policy, in particular its relations with poorer regions of the world. Tugendhat is considered by some to be a China hawk in the British Parliament, alongside Bob Seely and Sir Iain Duncan Smith.

In August 2020, Tugendhat received a letter at his home address, sent from Hong Kong and containing a prayer regarding his criticism of China's policies. On Twitter, Tugendhat said that this was sent by the Chinese authorities to threaten him, though this was not independently verified.

On 26 March 2021, it was announced that Tugendhat was one of five MPs to be sanctioned by China for spreading what it called "lies and disinformation" about the country. He was subsequently banned from entering China, Hong Kong and Macau, and Chinese citizens and institutions are prohibited from doing business with him. The sanctions were condemned by the Prime Minister and led the Foreign Secretary to summon the Chinese ambassador.

Israel 
Tugendhat is a strong supporter of Israel. He condemned the United Nations Security Council for its official criticism of Israel's building settlements in the occupied Palestinian territories. In January 2017, he wrote that the Israeli–Palestinian conflict "doesn't matter" to the protestors of the Arab Spring, and concluded that "Why was it [Israel-Palestine] more pressing than other disputed territories such as Western Sahara, Kashmir or Tibet? It isn't. It simply deflects attention for those most in need of a diversion".

Western democracies 
Tugendhat was a participant at the 30 May–2 June 2019 Bilderberg Meeting in Montreux, Switzerland; a discreet leadership group concerned with western alliances and the health of liberal democracy. He subsequently attended the 2022 Bilderberg meeting in Washington, D.C;

In the wake of the Fall of Kabul in August 2021, Tugendhat described the event in The Times as Britain's "biggest foreign policy disaster since Suez". On 18 August, in the House of Commons, Tugendhat was applauded after giving a speech that drew on his own military experiences in Afghanistan. It concluded, "This doesn't need to be defeat, but right now it damn well feels like it."

Personal life

Tugendhat holds dual British and French citizenship. His wife Anissia is a French judge and senior civil servant. Her father is Pierre Morel, a French diplomat, and currently (2022) mediator in Ukraine for the Organization for Security and Co-operation in Europe.

Tugendhat is a Roman Catholic who identifies with Jewish people. His paternal grandfather was an Austrian Jewish emigrant, from Vienna, who converted to Roman Catholicism. Following the December 2019 general election, Tugendhat criticised the antisemitism he had faced during the campaign: "It was a campaign that wasn't always as clean as previous ones. For the first time I faced antisemitism, which I found particularly offensive and very surprising for a community like this and frankly rather distasteful. It's very un-Tonbridge, it's very un-Kent and it's very un-British. ... I would hope that type of attitude is going to leave our politics for good."

On 17 November 2022 at Westminster Magistrates' Court, Tugenhat was banned from driving for six months after he was caught driving with his mobile phone in his hand on 14 April 2022. He received six points on his licence for the offence, in addition to six he already had for two previous driving offences. He was also ordered to pay a £1,000 fine, a surcharge of £100 and costs of £110. In a written guilty plea, Tugenhat said he was holding the phone but not using it and had later taken a driving course.

Honours
In the 2010 New Year Honours, Tugendhat was appointed a Member of the Order of the British Empire (MBE). In July 2013, he was awarded the Volunteer Reserves Service Medal for ten years' service in the Territorial Army. Tugendhat is an Honorary Professor at the University of Exeter within its Strategy and Security Institute.  He is an Honorary Fellow of St Augustine's College of Theology. He was sworn in as a member of His Majesty's Most Honourable Privy Council on 13 September 2022 at Buckingham Palace. This gave him the honorific prefix "The Right Honourable" for Life.

See also
 Tugendhat family

References

External links

Tugendhat's entry at Who's Who

1973 births
Living people
Alumni of Gonville and Caius College, Cambridge
Alumni of the University of Bristol
British Army personnel of the Iraq War
British Army personnel of the War in Afghanistan (2001–2021)
British Zionists
Conservative Party (UK) MPs for English constituencies
English people of Austrian-Jewish descent
English people of French descent
English people of Irish descent
English people of Polish-Jewish descent
English Roman Catholics
Intelligence Corps officers
Members of the Order of the British Empire
Members of the Privy Council of the United Kingdom
Military personnel from London
People educated at St Paul's School, London
Place of birth missing (living people)
Royal Army Educational Corps officers
UK MPs 2015–2017
UK MPs 2017–2019
UK MPs 2019–present
French people of Polish-Jewish descent
French people of Austrian-Jewish descent